Tyre Coast Nature Reserve to the southeast of Tyre, Lebanon covers over  and is divided into three zones: the tourism zone (public beaches, the old city and Souks, the ancient port), the agricultural and archaeological zone, and the Conservation zone that includes the Phoenician springs of Ras El Ain. Established in 1998, is an important sanctuary for wildlife and includes a public beach with yellow sand. The reserve is bisected by the Rachidiye refugee camp.

Due to its diverse flora and fauna, the reserve is a designated Ramsar Site. It is an important nesting site for migratory birds and the endangered Loggerhead and green sea turtle and the shelter of the Arabian spiny mouse and many other important creatures (including wall lizards, common pipistrelle, and european badger). Plant species include the cattail, sea daffodil, and sand lily.

See also
2021 Mediterranean oil spill

References

Parks in Lebanon
Ramsar sites in Lebanon
Tourist attractions in Lebanon